Gusheh (also Romanized as Gūsheh; also known as Goosheh Ghareh Kahriz) is a village in Shamsabad Rural District, in the Central District of Arak County, Markazi Province, Iran. At the 2006 census, its population was 295, in 76 families.

References 

Populated places in Arak County